Mandalagiri is a village in the Yelburga taluk of Koppal district in the Indian state of Karnataka.
Mandalagiri is 10 km from Kuknoor and 30 km from Gadag. Mandalagiri can be reached by Gadag-Kuknoor route.

See also
Yarehanchinal
Binnal
Chikkenakoppa
Bhatapanahalli
Itagi
Kuknoor
Yelburga
Koppal
Karnataka

References

Villages in Koppal district